

Archosauromorphs

Newly named pseudosuchians

Newly named dinosaurs

Pterosaurs

New taxa
''''

References

1870s in paleontology
Paleontology, 1871 In